Roger the Engineer (originally released in the UK as Yardbirds and in the US, Germany, France and Italy as Over Under Sideways Down) is the only UK studio album and third US album by English rock band the Yardbirds. Recorded and released in 1966, it is also the only Yardbirds album with guitarist Jeff Beck on all tracks and it contains all original material. It was produced by bassist Paul Samwell-Smith and manager Simon Napier-Bell.

Although the British edition is still officially titled Yardbirds by authoritative chart sources, such as Official Charts Company, it has since been referred to, first colloquially, then semi-officially, as Roger the Engineer, a title stemming from the cover drawing of the record's audio engineer Roger Cameron by band member Chris Dreja.

It is the only Yardbirds album to appear in the UK Albums Chart, where it reached number 20. In the US, it reached number 52 on the Billboard 200 album chart, making it the band's highest-charting studio album in the US. It also reached number 8 in Finland. The album's best-known song, "Over Under Sideways Down", was released as a single in May 1966, two months before the album.

The album is included in Robert Dimery's 1001 Albums You Must Hear Before You Die. In 2012, the album was ranked number 350 on Rolling Stone'''s list of the 500 greatest albums of all time.

Recording
The single "Over Under Sideways Down", along with the B-side "Jeff's Boogie", was recorded at Advision Studios in London on 19–20 April 1966. The rest of the album was recorded from 31 May to 4 June 1966, also at Advision. Paul Samwell-Smith and Simon Napier-Bell produced the album, which was released by the Columbia Graphophone Company in the UK on 15 July 1966 and by Epic Records in the US on 18 July 1966.

Legacy

Stephen Thomas Erlewine in a retrospective AllMusic review considers the album to be "the Yardbirds' best individual studio album, offering some of their very best psychedelia", though not "among the great albums of its era".Rolling Stone ranked the album at number 349 in 2003 and at number 350 in 2012 on its list of the "500 greatest albums of all time".

Track listing
All songs written by Chris Dreja, Jim McCarty, Jeff Beck, Keith Relf, and Paul Samwell-Smith (Dreja and McCarty's last names are misspelled as "Drega" and "McCarthy" on the labels of the US album). All songs are recorded in stereo, except where noted.

US release

Personnel
The Yardbirds
Keith Relf – lead vocals (except "The Nazz Are Blue"), harmonica
Jeff Beck – lead guitar, lead vocals on "The Nazz Are Blue", bass guitar on "Over, Under, Sideways, Down"
Chris Dreja – rhythm guitar, backing vocals, piano
Paul Samwell-Smith – bass guitar (except "Over, Under, Sideways, Down"), backing vocals
Jim McCarty – drums, backing vocals, percussion
Cover art
Chris Dreja – cover design and artwork
Jim McCarty – sleeve notes

Release history
The original American versions of this album (issued with a different album cover and titled Over Under Sideways Down after the hit song of the same name) omitted the songs "The Nazz Are Blue" (which was sung by Jeff Beck) and "Rack My Mind" and is mixed differently than the British editions. Regardless, record collectors have sought out both the mono (LN 24210) and stereo (BN 26210) versions since several tracks are featured with slight differences in the mixes (see US album listing above). Epic's 1983 reissue (simply titled The Yardbirds'') featured the original UK album cover, the two missing tracks, duplication of the British mixing, and two additional tracks: the 1966 single "Happenings Ten Years Time Ago" backed with "Psycho Daisies".

References

External links

1966 albums
The Yardbirds albums
Albums produced by Paul Samwell-Smith
EMI Columbia Records albums
Warner Records albums
Capitol Records albums
Repertoire Records albums